The Ontario Library Association (OLA) was established in 1900 and is the oldest continually operating library association in Canada. With 5,000 members, OLA is also the largest library association in Canada and among the 10 largest library associations in North America.

The stated purpose of the OLA is to "give profile to the librarians, library workers and trustees in the school, college, university, public and special libraries of Ontario and to foster provincial programs that will improve library services in the institutions and communities our members serve and that will ensure equitable access to information for all citizens of the province."

History 
Founded in 1900, the OLA was formed after a meeting of the American Library Association held that same year in Montreal, at which meeting it was decided that a Canadian association was not currently practical. Between 2006 and 2013, the OLA's office was at 50 Wellington Street, Toronto, Ontario. In 2013, the OLA moved to their current address at 2 Toronto Street, 3rd Floor, Toronto, Ontario.

Structure and leadership 
The OLA currently has seven divisions:

 L’Association des bibliothèques de l’Ontario-Franco (ABO-Franco)
Ontario College and University Library Association (OCULA)
Ontario Health Library and Information Association (OHLIA)
Ontario Library Boards’ Association (OLBA)
Ontario Library and Information Technology Association (OLITA)
 Ontario Public Library Association (OPLA)
 Ontario School Library Association (OSLA)
Each division is headed by a President and Vice-President, who also serve on the OLA Board of Directors. The Board of Directors also includes the Executive Director and the Executive committee, composed of the OLA President, OLA Vice President, OLA Past President, and OLA Treasurer.

Affiliates 
The OLA is affiliated with:

 Canadian Federation of Library Associations (CFLA-FCAB)
 Ex Libris Association (Canadian national association interested in historical and current issues about libraries, archives, publishing houses, and related institutions and people)
 Library and Archives Canada Stakeholder Group
 Ontario Health Libraries Association (OHLA)
 The Partnership (Canada’s national network of provincial and territorial library associations).

Events and programs 
The OLA runs several programs, services, and events. Three of its most prominent are the Forest of Reading program, the Library Marketplace, and the OLA Super Conference.

Forest of Reading 
OLA's Forest of Reading is Canada's largest recreational reading program, which has grown to ten reading awards programs since the early 1990s. More than 270,000 readers participate annually from their school and/or public libraries. The Forest award winners are chosen by votes cast by readers in the target age ranges for each of the specific book categories. Award winners are announced annually at the Forest of Reading Festival in Toronto.

The stated goals of the Forest of Reading are:
 fostering a love of reading 
 encouraging academic and social success in children through reading
 emphasizes the importance of libraries
 supports Canadian books, publishers, authors and illustrators.
The ten awards offered under the Forest of Reading umbrella are:

 Blue Spruce Award™ - ages 4–7 (JK–Grade 2), English, picture books
 Silver Birch Express Award® - ages 8–10 (Grades 3–4), English, fiction/non-fiction
 Silver Birch Fiction Award® - ages 8–12 (Grades 3–6 ), English, fiction
 Yellow Cedar Award - ages 9–14 (Grades 4–8), English, non-fiction
 Red Maple Award™ - ages 12–14 (Grades 7–8), English, fiction
 White Pine Award™ - high school (Grades 9–12), English, fiction
 Le prix Peuplier - ages vary, simple stories that can be read aloud, French, picture books
 Le prix Mélèze (formerly Le prix Tamarac Express) - ages vary, short chapter books, less than 100 pages, or advanced picture books, French, fiction/nonfiction
 Le prix Tamarac - ages vary, chapter books, 100-250 pages, French, fiction/nonfiction
 Evergreen Award™ - adult, fiction/non-fiction

Library Marketplace/OLA Press 
The Library Marketplace is the official store of the OLA and supports the OLA's position as the Canadian agent for twelve major professional library publishers and the International Reading Association. The OLA also operates its own OLA Press, which publishes books, reports, and governance information for the OLA.

OLA Super Conference 
Begun in 1902 as the OLA's annual conference, the event was rebranded in 1995 as the Super Conference. Collectively, this history makes the Super Conference Canada’s largest continuing education event in librarianship. The Super Conference also includes within it Canada's largest library tradeshow. The event is held annually in Toronto, Ontario.

OLA Presidents

External links 
Ontario Library Association website

References

Canadian library associations
Professional associations based in Ontario
Organizations established in 1900
1900 establishments in Ontario